Polaris is a star, also known as the North Star.

Polaris may also refer to:

Geography
 Polaris, California, in Nevada County, United States
 Polaris, Montana, in Beaverhead County, United States
 Polaris mine, Little Cornwallis Island, Nunavut, Canada

Arts, entertainment, and media

Fictional entities
 Polaris (Marvel Comics), a Marvel Comics superhero
 Polaris galaxy, featured in the video game Ratchet & Clank Future: Tools of Destruction
 Polaris, the ultimate antagonist of the video game Shin Megami Tensei: Devil Survivor 2
 Polaris Hilda, character from the Saint Seiya anime and manga/comics
 Doctor Polaris, a DC Comics villain
 Polaris P. Polanski, an alias of Byakuya Togami in the novel Danganronpa Togami, by Yuya Sato

Games
 Polaris (1997 role-playing game)
 Polaris (2005 role-playing game)
 Polaris (video game), a 1980 arcade game

Literature
 Polaris (novel), by Jack McDevitt
 "Polaris" (short story), by H. P. Lovecraft

Music

Groups
 Polaris (Australian band), an Australian metalcore band
 Polaris (American band), an American rock band

Albums and EPs
 Polaris (Kangta album), 2001
 Polaris (Stratovarius album), 2009
 Polaris (Tesseract album), 2015
 Polaris (EP), 2020 EP by Aitch

Compositions and songs
 Polaris (composition), 2010 composition by Thomas Adès
 "Polaris" (song), from the album Twilight of the Innocents by Ash
 "Polaris", from the album Futures by Jimmy Eat World
 "Rust in Peace... Polaris", from the album Rust in Peace by Megadeth
 "Polaris" (ポラリス), from the album Karma by MUCC
 "Polaris", from the single Silent Bible by Nana Mizuki
 "Polaris", from the album Nocturne by The Human Abstract
 "Polaris", from the album Simple Things by Zero 7
 "Polaris", the sixth opening theme for My Hero Academia and the first for season 4, by Blue Encount
 "Polaris", from the album After the Magic by Parannoul

Prizes
 Polaris Music Prize

Other uses in arts, entertainment, and media
 Polaris (2016 film), a 2016 film directed by Soudabeh Moradian
 Polaris (2022 film), a 2022 film directed by Kirsten Carthew
 Polaris (periodical), produced by Visual Collaborative
 Polaris Tower, a giant Ferris wheel at Kumdori Land, Yuseong-gu, Daejon, Korea
 Polaris, a subsidiary of Disney Digital Network specialising in video game culture

Brands and enterprises
 Polaris Entertainment, South Korean record label
 Polaris Fashion Place, Columbus, Ohio, a two level shopping mall and surrounding retail plaza
 Polaris Inc., American snowmobile, ATV, and motorcycle manufacturer
 Polaris Motor, an Italian ultralight trike manufacturer
 Polaris Pro Grappling, a British grappling tournament running since 2015

Computing
 Polaris (poker bot)
 Polaris (processor)
 Polaris, the GPU architecture featured in AMD's Radeon RX 400 and RX 500 series
 Polaris, an integrated library system from Innovative Interfaces, Inc.
 Polaris, a port of Solaris to PowerPC
 Polaris, the development codename for Windows Media Player 11
 Polaris Office, office suite that runs on mobile platforms

Military
 Polaris spacecraft, or TecSAR, Israeli reconnaissance satellite
 Polaris-1, a North Korean submarine-launched ballistic missile, which is commonly known as KN-11 by the West and Pukkuksong-1 (Pukkuksong means Polaris in Korean) in North Korea
 UGM-27 Polaris, an early United States submarine-launched ballistic missile that was also used by United Kingdom
 UK Polaris programme, a British nuclear weapons programme for Resolution-class ballistic missile submarines

Transport
 Polaris (train), manufactured in China
 Polaris program, a U.S. SpaceX/Shift4/Isaacman commercial human spaceflight project

Aviation
 Airbus CC-150 Polaris, a Canadian military plane
 B&F Fk14 Polaris, a German ultralight aircraft
 Polaris, United Airlines business class product
 Polaris Award, awarded to airline crews

Ships
 Polaris (ship), a list of ships
 Polaris (icebreaker), a 2015 Finnish icebreaker
 , a Russian-owned passenger ship built in Denmark in 1968
 RV Polaris, listed on the National Register of Historic Places listings in San Mateo County, California
 USS Amber (PYc-6), known as Polaris, a 1930 motor yacht that later became a patrol vessel
 , a steamer sunk in 1872 on an Arctic expedition
 , a freighter built in 1938

Other uses
 Polaris (convention), an annual science fiction and fantasy convention
 POLARIS (seismology), an underground experiment to observe seismic signals
 Polaris expedition, an American attempt to reach the North Pole which resulted in Commander Charles F. Hall's suspicious death
 Project Polaris, a U.S.-Canadian military aerial survey of the Canadian Arctic Archipelago
 Polaris Project, an American anti-human-trafficking organization

See also

 Pole (disambiguation)
 Polar (disambiguation)
 Polara (disambiguation)
 Polari, a form of cant slang
 
 
 North Star (disambiguation)